Nantasha M. Williams (born March 29, 1988) is an American politician from New York City. A Democrat, Williams represents the 27th district in the New York City Council, which covers parts of southeastern Queens.

Early life and education
Williams was born in Queens, and was raised by a single mother who worked as a social worker. She received a BA from Virginia Commonwealth University and an MPA from SUNY Albany, and is currently enrolled in a PhD program at the CUNY Graduate Center.

Career
Prior to seeking elected office herself, Williams held a number of staff roles in the office of Assemblywoman Diana Richardson, eventually rising to become Richardson's chief of staff. Williams was also appointed as the executive director of New York State's Black, Puerto Rican, Hispanic and Asian Legislative Caucus, which represents state assemblymembers and senators of color.

2016 State Assembly campaign
In 2016, after the death of Assemblywoman Barbara Clark, Williams announced she would run for the 33rd district of the New York State Assembly in southeastern Queens. She faced Clyde Vanel, who had run for the seat twice before, and three other candidates in the Democratic primary. Vanel ultimately defeated Williams by a narrow margin, 32-28%, and went on to win the seat in the general election.

2021 City Council election
Four years after her Assembly campaign, with incumbent City Councilman Daneek Miller term-limited, Williams launched her campaign for the 27th district of the New York City Council, a heavily overlapping constituency. Williams received endorsements from Assemblywoman Alicia Hyndman and nearly all of the city's major unions, but many other power players remained neutral among the crowded race's twelve contenders.

On primary election night on June 22, Williams emerged with a strong lead, earning 36 percent of the vote while her nearest competitor was far behind with 11 percent; she officially won two weeks later, after ranked-choice votes and absentee ballots were counted. She ran uncontested in the November general election, and was elected. She assumed office on January 1, 2022.

First Term (2022-2023)
Shortly after being elected, Council Member Williams was appointed to Chair the NYC Council's Committee on Civil and Human Rights, and sit on the following committees: Economic Development, General Welfare, Mental Health, Disabilities, and Addictions, Oversight and Investigations, Sanitation and Solid Waste Management, Transportation and Infrastructure, and Youth Services.

Personal life
Williams lives in Cambria Heights.

References

Living people
1988 births
Politicians from Queens, New York
Virginia Commonwealth University alumni
University at Albany, SUNY alumni
New York (state) Democrats
African-American people in New York (state) politics
African-American women in politics
21st-century American women politicians
21st-century American politicians
21st-century African-American women
21st-century African-American politicians
20th-century African-American people
20th-century African-American women
Women New York City Council members
New York City Council members